Shiloh is a census-designated place (CDP) in Harrison Township in Montgomery County, Ohio, United States. It was delineated as a census-designated place at the 2000 census, at which time its population was 11,272. It was not delineated as a CDP at the 2010 census. It is located directly north of the city of Dayton and is part of the Dayton Metropolitan Statistical Area.

The community took its name from the Shiloh Church which was established "in an early day".

Geography
Shiloh is located at  (39.808657, -84.225323).

Demographics

As of the census of 2000, there were 11,272 people, 5,700 households, and 2,736 families residing in the CDP. The population density was 2,936.8 people per square mile (1,133.4/km). There were 6,209 housing units at an average density of 1,617.7/sq mi (624.3/km). The racial makeup of the CDP was 61.65% White, 34.93% African American, 0.20% Native American, 0.69% Asian, 0.04% Pacific Islander, 0.50% from other races, and 2.00% from two or more races. Hispanic or Latino of any race were 1.15% of the population.

There were 5,700 households, out of which 18.8% had children under the age of 18 living with them, 33.5% were married couples living together, 11.4% had a female householder with no husband present, and 52.0% were non-families. 45.5% of all households were made up of individuals, and 15.2% had someone living alone who was 65 years of age or older. The average household size was 1.91 and the average family size was 2.68.

In the CDP the population was spread out, with 17.3% under the age of 18, 7.9% from 18 to 24, 28.0% from 25 to 44, 25.8% from 45 to 64, and 21.1% who were 65 years of age or older. The median age was 43 years. For every 100 females, there were 84.2 males. For every 100 females age 18 and over, there were 79.5 males.

The median income for a household in the CDP was $35,489, and the median income for a family was $48,109. Males had a median income of $34,785 versus $30,205 for females. The per capita income for the CDP was $22,532. About 5.0% of families and 10.0% of the population were below the poverty line, including 11.7% of those under age 18 and 9.5% of those age 65 or over.

References

Unincorporated communities in Montgomery County, Ohio
Unincorporated communities in Ohio